is a dam in Miki, Hyōgo Prefecture, Japan. Catching the waters of the Sijimi and Yamada rivers, the catchment becomes known as Tsukuhara Lake.

Uses
Other than just creating hydro electricity the catchment area of 328.8km2 provides drinking water supply and industrial supply to nearby Kobe; as well as irrigation, flood control, removal of melting snow and recreational uses.

References

Dams in Hyogo Prefecture
Dams completed in 1989